Friedrich Salomon Beer (1 September 1846 – 18 October 1912) was an Austrian-French sculptor.

External links 
 

1846 births
1912 deaths
20th-century Austrian sculptors
20th-century Austrian male artists
19th-century Austrian sculptors
19th-century Austrian male artists
Austrian male sculptors
20th-century French sculptors
20th-century French male artists
19th-century French sculptors
19th-century French male artists
French male sculptors